Kitui High School is a boys boarding secondary school in Kitui County and the only national boys secondary school in the county. It has a population of 1,200 students. It is located about 2 kilometers from Kitui town along the Kitui-Mbusyani road.

History
Kitui School began as an intermediate school in 1908 before changing to a boarding school in 1948. The school was by that time known as Campbell Academy. It started offering A-level classes in 1971.

Notable alumni and academicians
 Willy Mutunga, Retired Chief Justice of Kenya
 Kalonzo Musyoka, 10th Vice-President of Kenya
 Makau Mutua, Former Dean of the University of Buffalo Law School
 John Ndirangu, Former Embakasi Central MP
 Ngumbau Mulwa, Mumias Sugar Company Limited director
 George Kenyatta Muumbo, Presidential candidate in Kenyan general election, 2013
 Ngala Mwendwa, A member of the Kenyan delegation to the 1960 Lancaster House Conference
 Muthomi Njuki, Governor Tharaka Nithi County and former Chuka-Igambang'ombe MP (taught Biology and coached rugby)
 Benjamin Nzimbi, Retired Archbishop and Primate of the Anglican Church of Kenya

References

Boarding schools in Kenya
High schools and secondary schools in Kenya
Boys' schools in Kenya
Educational institutions established in 1908
Kitui County
1908 establishments in the British Empire